Greens Gap is an extinct town in Catron County, in the U.S. state of New Mexico. The GNIS classifies it as a populated place.

A post office was established at Greens Gap in 1918, and remained in operation until 1942. The community was named after the local Green family, early settlers.

References

Ghost towns in New Mexico
Landforms of Catron County, New Mexico